Dr. Wayne Adrian Davis is a member of the World Scout Committee, the executive body of the World Organization of the Scout Movement (WOSM). He previously served as the Regional Chair of the African Regional Scout Committee.

In 2012, Davis was appointed as the representative of WOSM in future Africa Union Heads of Summit meetings as WOSM enjoys observer status at the African Union.

Background
A "navy brat", Davis was born to American parents overseas. He became an educator, setting up a school in Addis Ababa, and became involved with the Ethiopia Scout Association, serving in various national positions. He eventually moved back to New Jersey to work for Sylvan Learning in a school in Woodbridge.

References

External links

Dr W A Davis - 12696 | World Scouting
Conferences
WOSM Europos regiono simpoziumas Dubline - Naujienos | Skautai - geresniam pasauliui

World Scout Committee members
Living people
Year of birth missing (living people)
American expatriates in Ethiopia
African Union officials